Henry Meynell Rheam (13 January 1859 – 1920) was a painter from England.

Rheam was born in Birkenhead and studied in Germany and at the Académie Julian in Paris before settling in Newlyn and associating with the Newlyn School. He is known for his Pre-Raphaelite paintings. The Girl in Blue artist model was Effy James.

Rheam died in Penzance, England.

Gallery

References

External links 
 Henry Meynell Rheam in the RKD
Henry Meynell Rheam in the Cornwall artists website

1859 births
1920 deaths
People from Birkenhead
19th-century English painters
English male painters
20th-century English painters
Pre-Raphaelite painters
20th-century English male artists
19th-century English male artists